The Wellington Writers Walk is made up of a series of 23 quotations from New Zealand writers, including poets, novelists, and playwrights. The quotations are placed along the Wellington waterfront, from Kumutoto stream to Oriental Bay, in the form of contemporary concrete plaques or inlaid metal text on wooden 'benchmarks'. They were designed by Catherine Griffiths and Fiona Christeller and installed to honour and celebrate the lives and works of these well-known writers, all of whom had (or have) some connection to Wellington.

History 
The Wellington Writers Walk began as a project of the Wellington Branch of the New Zealand Society of Authors (PEN NZ Inc.) Te Puni Kaituhi o Aotearoa under the inaugural committee of Eirlys Hunter (convenor), Robin Fleming, Dame Fiona Kidman, Barbara Murison, Ann Packer, Susan Pearce, Judy Siers and Joy Tonks. The committee later comprised Rosemary Wildblood (convenor), Robyn Cooper, Sarah Gaitanos, Michael Keith and Barbara Murison.

The first series of 11 concrete plaques were designed by internationally renowned typographer Catherine Griffiths, with each plaque having an individual sponsor. The Writers Walk was opened during New Zealand Post Writers and Readers Week, part of the International Festival of the Arts, on 11 March 2002. Stage Two of the Walk was launched on 8 May 2004. Catherine Griffiths was awarded the Terry Stringer Award at the BEST Design Awards in 2002 for her work on the sculptures.

The quotations for Jack Lasenby, Joy Cowley, James McNeish and Elizabeth Knox were unveiled by the then patron, Governor-General Sir Jerry Mateparae, in a ceremony on the waterfront on 20 March 2013. These were designed by award-winning Wellington architect Fiona Christeller.

The Writers Walk attracts a lot of attention from locals as well as visitors, tourists, bloggers and photographers, and is also a popular expedition for school groups.

Past Patrons of the Wellington Writers Walk have included Dame Silvia Cartwright, Sir Anand Satyanand, Sir Jerry Mateparae and Lady Janine Mateparae and Dame Patsy Reddy.

Events 
In 2008, the Wellington Writers Walk committee held the Wellington Sonnet Competition, sponsored by New Zealand Post, which attracted over 200 entries. The competition was judged by Harry Ricketts and won by Michele Amas, with Saradha Koirala and Richard Reeve in second and third place respectively.

In 2012, New Zealand was Guest of Honour at the Frankfurt Book Fair, and the Wellington Writers Walk played a starring role, with large decals of the quotations appearing alongside the River Main in Frankfurt. It was launched there in September 2012 by New Zealand writers Hamish Clayton and Tina Makereti, both in residence at Frankfurt's Weltkulturen Museum.

The Writers Walk featured in a 2015 Spectrum documentary when presenter Jack Perkins explored part of the walk with Rosemary Wildblood, Barbara Murison and Philippa Werry.

In 2017, a project for the Wai-Te-Ata Press at Victoria University of Wellington, called the Literary Atlas of Wellington, was undertaken to create an augmented reality mobile application based on the Wellington Writers Walk.

List

References

External links 

 Wellington Writers Walk website

New Zealand writers